Safelight is a 2015 American drama film, written and directed by Tony Aloupis, and starring Juno Temple, Evan Peters, Kevin Alejandro, Jason Beghe, Ariel Winter, and Christine Lahti. The film had its world premiere on April 17, 2015 at the Nashville Film Festival.

The film was released in a limited release and through video on demand on July 17, 2015 by ARC Entertainment.

Plot
The film is set in the 1970s and it starts off in front of a truck stop where Vickie is getting roughed up by Skid (Alejandro), her narcissistic pimp. Seeing this physical exchange taking place, Charles, who had been working at the truck stop, comes outside with a bat telling Skid to leave her alone. Skid eventually drives off not taking Charles seriously due to his physical condition.

Charles (Peters) is a 17-year-old high school student who gets constantly bullied because of his physical disability, but finds solace in taking photographs. One day at school Charles's teacher, Mr. Sullivan (Gretsch), announces that a photography contest would be taking place at the school. Intrigued, Charles takes a flyer.

Charles lives at home with his supportive father, Eric (Beghe), who is dying. Back at the truck stop, Charles works for a witty middle-aged woman named, Peg (Lahti), who absolutely adores and encourages him.

Vickie (Temple) is an 18-year-old prostitute who lives in a motel room near the truck stop. Vickie relentlessly puts up with her crazy women-hating pimp, Skid, who always wants his cut of the money she makes for hooking.

Meanwhile, Vickie keeps on coming into the truck stop in between her sessions with various truck drivers, making small talk with Charles.

Charles is thinking about entering the photography contest but he doesn't know what his theme will be.

During one of his shifts Vickie comes in and notices Charles contest flyer and asks him if he is going to enter. Charles expresses that he wants to take photos of the California lighthouses, but that he would need someone to drive him, on account of his physical disability. Vickie then offers to drive Charles around so that he could take pictures of the different lighthouses for his contest.

At the first lighthouse Charles tells Vickie that his mother abandoned him when he was young and that the camera he was using to take the photos belonged to his brother, Kevin, who was killed in Vietnam. To which, Vickie revealed that her father was dead and that her mother kicked her out of the house.

At the second lighthouse Vickie reveals to Charles that her mother kicked her out the house because she thought that Vickie was messing around with one of her boyfriends and that once she was on her own she met Skid. Seeing that Charles and Vickie were getting closer, Peg invites her out to go dancing with her, Charles and a couple of her girlfriends, Vickie agrees. During their night out Vickie persuades Charles to slow dance with her and the two share a kiss.

Before Vickie and Charles go to the third lighthouse, Charles persuades Vickie to go visit her family, but once they arrive Vickie is greeted with a mixed reception by her sisters, Sharon (Martin) and Kate (Winter).

Then, one day on his way to work, Charles bumps into Skid, Vickie's psychotic pimp, who starts having a conversation with Charles about his disdain towards women, rooted in the fact that he had a bad mother.

At the fourth lighthouse Vickie expresses to Charles how much she appreciates him and that she'll miss going to lighthouses with him.

Vickie and Charles stop by Vickie's family house for another visit. While looking through old photos of one another, Kate tells Vickie that she is nothing but a whore at which Vickie walks out of the house. Still outside her family's home, and crying, Vickie becomes angry with Charles for persuading her to see her family again and telling him that the only reason she hung out with him was because she felt sorry for him. Days go by, and Vickie stops talking to Charles and stays away from the truck stop. Meanwhile, Charles finally hands in his collection of photos for the contest to which he titles, "Beacon of Light".

On his way home from school Charles runs into neighborhood bullies, who push him down and break his camera.

While at work, Skid, who is showing symptoms of paranoia, asks Charles if he has seen Vickie lately, Charles tells Skid that he hasn't seen Vickie in a while, Skid leaves.

Back at home, Charles and his dying father are sitting outside their home, during which time Charles's father tells him how much he loves him and that he is proud of the man he has become. Charles's father passes away a few moments later.

After the funeral, Peg, seeing how Charles was under duress about his father passing away, tells him that she'll always be there for him. Charles ends up placing third in the photography contest. Skid eventually ends up tracking down Vickie and waits for her in her motel room until she arrives. Once Vickie arrives, she asks Skid to leave and tells him that she never stole from him. Skid then throws a stack of money, that Vickie was trying to hide from him, in her face. Skid punches Vickie and pins her down onto the bed.

Charles arrives suddenly and tells Skid to stop hurting Vickie. Skid and Charles get into a physical altercation, at which point Vickie grabs her gun and shoots Skid. The film ends with Charles and Vickie saying goodbye to one another and Vickie driving off down the road while Charles takes picture of her leaving the truck stop.

Cast

Evan Peters as Charles
Juno Temple as Vicki
Kevin Alejandro as Skid
Meaghan Martin as Sharon
Jason Beghe as Eric
Ariel Winter as Kate
Matthew Ziff as Kyle
Don Stark as Jack Campbell
Ever Carradine as Lois
Christine Lahti as Peg
Joel Gretsch as Mr. Sullivan
Roma Maffia as Rose
Gigi Rice as Lillian
Will Peltz as Jason

Production
In March 2012, Evan Peters and Juno Temple were cast in the two leading roles. The film was originally titled Truck Stop. In April 2012, Christine Lahti joined the cast as a character named Peg, Matthew Ziff joined the cast as Kyle, and Meaghan Martin was cast as Sharon.

Marketing and release
On February 17, 2015, the first theatrical trailer was released for the film. Safelight had its world premiere at the Nashville Film Festival on April 17, 2015, and screened at the Newport Beach Film Festival on April 25, 2015. On June 4, 2015, it was announced ARC Entertainment had acquired distribution rights to the film and set a date for a limited release and video on demand release of July 17, 2015.

Reception
On Metacritic, Safelight got 26% based on 7 reviews. The Hollywood Reporter stated that in the film "a single dramatic cliche is missed" while Brian Tallerico of RogerEbert.com gave it a half star, criticizing everything about the film.

References

External links

2015 drama films
2015 films
2015 independent films
2010s English-language films
2010s teen drama films
American independent films
American teen drama films
Films scored by Joel P. West
2010s American films